Al Larson Boat Shop or Al Larson Boat Building is a shipbuilding and dry dock repair company in San Pedro, California on Terminal Island. To support the World War 2 demand for ships Al Larson Boat Shop built: US Navy Sub chasers and Minesweepers. Al Larson Boat Shop was started in 1903 by Peter Adolph (Al) Larson, a Swedish immigrant. Larson started by building boats by hand from Pacific Northwest lumber. As the shop grew, he moved to its current location in Fish Harbor, in the Port of Los Angeles. Adolph Larson's son sold the boat shop in 1960 to Andy and Gloria Wall. The shop was small at this time with only five employees. The Wall family is still running the shipyard in the Port of Los Angeles. The shipyard is the only one in the Port of Los Angeles now operating and able to work on ships of all sizes with its 100 employees. The shipyard is at 1046 South Seaside Ave, Terminal Island, with 2.35 acres of land and 5.35 acres of waterways. The shipyard also runs a marina, Al Larson Marina.

Notable ships 
 Converted to Minesweeper and reefer ship: ,  and  
 SC-734 US Navy Sub Chaser, Patrol Boat, Keel laid 4/15/42. Launched 7/18/42. Commissioned 12/28/42. Transferred to Foreign in 4/25/47.
 SC-735 US Navy Sub Chaser, Patrol Boat, Keel laid 4/20/42. Launched 8/29/42. Commissioned 3/12/43. Transferred to China in 6/30/48. The two SC-497-class submarine chasers had one 40mm AA gun, two .50 cal. machine guns, two depth charge projector "Y Guns," and two depth charge tracks. Powered by two 880bhp General Motors 8-268A diesel engines.
 AB-67 renamed CG-56306, harbor tug built in 1937. Were 32 tons, top speed 11-knots. 56 feet long, a beam of 14 feet, a draft of 4.5 feet, powered by a 150 H.P diesel, was stationed in San Francisco.
 AB-68 renamed CG-56307, harbor tug was stationed in Seattle. Specs same as AB-67.

See also
California during World War II
Maritime history of California
Wooden boats of World War 2
San Pedro Boatworks

References

American Theater of World War II
1940s in California
American boat builders
Al Larson Boat Shop